Recovery was launched at Ayre in 1819. She traded between Great Britain and North America and the Caribbean. She suffered three major maritime incidents, the first in 1822 and the second in 1826. Her crew abandoned her at sea in August 1829.

Career
Recovery first appeared in Lloyd's Register (LR) in 1819.

She was on a voyage from New Orleans, Louisiana to Greenock. Recovery was refloated on 30 May. The paddlesteamer  towed her into Greenock. Recovery had lost her anchors and cables and had been obliged to throw some of her cargo, spars, and stores overboard. While Recovery had been on her journey the naval schooners  and  stopped her in the Gulf of Florida. The schooners were on anti-piracy patrol; they treated Recovery with "great politeness".

Recovery, Wilson, master, arrived at Greenock on 5 October 1826 from Jamaica. She had left Jamaica on 5 August. On 7 September she experienced a dreadful gale during which she lost the sternboat, part of the bulwarks, two water casks and sundry articles.

Loss
Although the 1829 volume Lloyd's Register of showed a voyage to Bombay, that appears to have been an intention. There is readily available evidence for such voyage.

On 28 August 1829 her crew abandoned Recovery, Patterson, master, in the Atlantic Ocean. She developed a leak that the pumps could not overcome, forcing her crew to abandon her. Lyra, May, master, rescued the 13 surviving crew members. Recovery was on a voyage from Trinidad to London. Lyra had been on her way to England from St Johns, New Brunswick and she brought the survivors into Plymouth.

Notes and citations
Notes

Citations

1819 ships
Age of Sail merchant ships of England
Maritime incidents in May 1822
Maritime incidents in September 1826
Maritime incidents in August 1829